Cosset may refer to:

 François Cosset (c. 1610 – c. 1673), French composer
 Sébastien Cosset (born 1975), French illustrator
 Helicopter parent, also referred to as "cosseting parent"

See also
 Corset, a garment